Riding Shotgun is a comic written by Nate Bowden and Tracy Yardley, and published by Tokyopop in 2006.  A motion comic was created out of volume 1 for YouTube, with music by Far East Movement and Interceptor.  A 6-minute 13 second short film was released through Mondo Media on YouTube on Aug 2, 2013.

Story
Doyle Harrington and Abby Witt are a team of assassins in a world where assassination has been legalized in America.

Reception
ComicCritique.com gave it five stars.

References

External links
Riding Shotgun Motion Comics (TokyoPop TV YouTube) #1 #2 #3 #4 #5 #6 #7 #8 #9 #10 #11 #12 #13 #14 #15 #16 #17 #18 #19 #20
Riding Shotgun: The Animated Series pilot/crowdfunding promo video (Mondo Media YouTube channel)

Original English-language manga
Tokyopop titles
2006 comics debuts